Risk transformation is about how to mitigate risk and in parallel develop competitive advantages. The goals of risk transformation are first to combat risk and secondly to differentiate and create solutions for the benefits of clients/users. Risk may include financial risk, security/safety-related risks, uncertainty, and risk through action or lack of action.

Roles 
Risk transformation is relevant in many areas, such as:
 Regulatory risks, involving compliance or lack of compliance
 Risk related to management and operations
 Organizational risk
 Project management risk 
 Systems implementation and technical support risks
 Strategy risk, related to strategy development and execution, or lack of strategy
 Functional risks, such as within sales/marketing, logistics, production, and finance
 Security/safety risks, including attacks related to terror, criminals and attacks on countries and organisations from other nations

References

Further reading 
 
 

Risk management in business